Huong Keenleyside (born 1971) is a Vietnamese-born British novelist.

She was born in Hanoi to Vietnamese parents. Hương originally followed in her father's path to open a tailor shop at the age of 17. She moved to the United Kingdom in 1998, to her husband's home county of Yorkshire, and established a new fashion business.

She has written three books:
Secrets of [the] soul (Hanoi, 1994)
For the love of Vietnam, espionage fiction (London, 2007)
Cầu vồng ở Iraq ("Rainbow in Iraq"), collection of stories (2009)

References

1971 births
British writers
British people of Vietnamese descent
Living people
People from Hanoi
Vietnamese emigrants to the United Kingdom
Vietnamese writers
English-language literature of Vietnam